The 2020–21 NCHC men's ice hockey season was the 8th season of play for National Collegiate Hockey Conference and took place during the 2020–21 NCAA Division I men's ice hockey season. The start of the season was delayed until December 1, 2020 and concluded on April 10, 2021. St. Cloud State made its first championship appearance, finishing as the national runner-up.

Season
Due to the ongoing COVID-19 pandemic, all NCHC teams scrapped their non-conference schedules. The league ended up delaying the start to the season until the beginning of December, 2 months later than usual. All eight member teams began the year playing at the Baxter Arena in Omaha, Nebraska. All games in the month of December were set at the Mavericks' home arena and the pattern for the remainder of the season was set. North Dakota and Minnesota Duluth lived up to their preseason billing while Denver and Western Michigan both eventually fell from the rankings. The later two were quickly replaced by St. Cloud State and Omaha. From the time the clubs returned home in January to the end of the season, very little movement was seen as far as their national rankings.

By the time the conference tournament began, the NCHC was all but guaranteed to receive 4 bids to the NCAA tournament. Even after Omaha was upset in the quarterfinals by Denver, they only fell from 12 to 14 and did end up with one of the final at-large bids. North Dakota, the #1 team for much of the season, received the top overall seed after winning the conference title and opened NCAA play against #16 American International. They did not, however, have the easiest path into the quarterfinals as Duluth ended up getting advanced due to a withdrawal by Michigan.

The NCHC proved to be the strongest conference by having the most teams in every round of the NCAA tournament. One of the biggest games, outside of the championship, was the quarterfinal match between North Dakota and Minnesota Duluth that set a new NCAA record for the longest game in tournament history. The match required 5 extra periods and went on so long that UMD starting goaltender Zach Stejskal had to be replaced due to cramping. The Bulldogs did eventually win the game on a goal by Freshman Luke Mylymok and make their 4th consecutive Frozen Four. While St. Cloud State had a chance to extend the conference's championship run to five, they were defeated in the final by Massachusetts.

Standings

Coaches
Entering the season, Scott Sandelin needed 9 more wins to become 45th coach in NCAA history to record 400 victories for a career.

Records

Conference tournament

NCAA tournament

Regional semifinals

Midwest

After seeding, Michigan, Minnesota Duluth's opponent in the first round, was forced to withdraw due to COVID-19 positive tests. UMD was automatically advanced to the second round by a no-contest decision.

West

Northeast

Regional finals

West

Northeast

Frozen Four

National Championship

Statistics

Leading scorers
GP = Games played; G = Goals; A = Assists; Pts = Points; PIM = Penalties in minutes

Leading goaltenders
Minimum 1/3 of team's minutes played in conference games.

GP = Games played; Min = Minutes played; W = Wins; L = Losses; T = Ties; GA = Goals against; SO = Shutouts; SV% = Save percentage; GAA = Goals against average

Ranking

USCHO

USCHO did not release a poll in week 20.

USA Today

Awards

NCAA

NCHC

Conference tournament

NCAA tournament

2021 NHL Entry Draft

† incoming freshman

References

External links

2020–21 National Collegiate Hockey Conference men's ice hockey season
NCHC
2021–22